The ZB vz. 26 was a Czechoslovak light machine gun developed in the 1920s, which went on to enter service with several countries. It saw its major use during World War II, and spawned the related ZB vz. 27, vz. 30, and vz. 33. The ZB vz. 26 influenced many other light machine gun designs including the British Bren light machine gun and the Japanese Type 97 heavy tank machine gun. The ZB-26 is famous for its reliability, simple components, quick-change barrel and ease of manufacturing.
This light machine gun in the Czechoslovak army was marked as the LK vz. 26 ("LK" means lehký kulomet, light machine gun; "vz." stands for vzor, Model in Czech). ZB vz. 26 is incorrect nomenclature because "ZB-26" is a factory designation (Československá zbrojovka v Brně), while "vzor 26" or "vz. 26" is an army designation.

Development
In around 1921 the military of the young Czechoslovakian state embarked on a quest for a light machine gun of their own. Early trials included foreign designs such as Berthier, M1918 Browning automatic rifle, Darne machine gun, Hotchkiss M1914 machine gun, Madsen machine gun, St. Étienne Mle 1907, and several domestic designs. Of these, the most important was the Praha II, a lightweight, belt-fed weapon built at Česka Zbrojovka (CZ) Praha (Czech Arms factory in Prague).

Development of the ZB-26 began in 1923 after the Czechoslovak Brno arms factory was built. Since CZ-Praha was a relatively small factory with limited industrial capabilities, it was decided to transfer the production of the new automatic weapon to the more advanced Zbrojovka Brno, or ZB in short. This transfer resulted in a long series of court trials over royalties, between the owners of the design (CZ-Praha) and the manufacturer (ZB). Designer Václav Holek was charged by the Czechoslovak army with producing a new light machine gun. He was assisted by his brother Emmanuel, as well as two Austrian and Polish engineers, respectively named Marek and Podrabsky. Holek quickly began work on the prototype of the Praha II and within a year the quartet had created an automatic light machine gun that was later known as the ZB.

Before long, the Holek brothers abandoned the belt feed in favor of a top-feeding box magazine and the resulting weapon, known as the Praha I-23, was selected. Despite the past legal troubles, manufacture of the new weapon had commenced at the ZB factory by late 1926, and it became the standard light machine gun of the Czechoslovak Army by 1928.

Design
The ZB-26 is a gas-operated, air-cooled, selective-fire machine gun. It has a finned, quick-detachable barrel and fires from an open bolt. Its action is powered by a long-stroke gas piston, located below the barrel. The gas block is mounted at the muzzle end of the barrel and also serves as the front sight base. The action is locked by tipping the rear of the bolt (breechblock) upwards, and into a locking recess in the receiver. The return spring is located in the butt of the weapon, and is connected to the bolt carrier/gas piston via a long rod; additionally, there is a short spring buffer located around the return spring at the juncture of the receiver and butt, which softens the impact of the bolt group at the end of its rearward stroke.

Its charging handle is located at the right side of receiver and does not reciprocate when the gun is fired. The ammunition feed is from a top-mounted box magazine made from sheet steel, holding just 20 rounds in a two-row configuration. The magazine housing has a forward-sliding dust cover. Spent cartridges are ejected downwards. The ejection port is normally closed with its own dust cover which opens automatically once the trigger is pressed. The trigger unit permits both single shots and automatic fire, selectable through a safety/fire mode selector lever situated at the left side of the pistol grip. The gun fires from an open bolt and the spring-loaded firing pin is operated by a projection on the bolt carrier, once the bolt is fully in battery and locked. Because of the overhead magazine, the sight line is offset to the left, and the front sight is mounted on a base which protrudes upward and to the left from the gas block.

The rear sight is attached to the left side of receiver, and has a range adjustment mechanism controlled by a knurled rotating knob. Standard furniture consists of an integral folding bipod, which is attached to the gas cylinder tube, and a wooden butt with a spring-buffered buttplate and a folding shoulder rest plate. Although the ZB-26 was intended for the light machine gun role, it was also offered with a sustained-fire tripod, and provided with a sufficient supply of full magazines and spare barrels it could serve (to some extent) as a medium machine gun. The same tripod was also adaptable for the anti-aircraft role.

Deployment and service
The ZB-26 saw service with the Czechoslovak infantry from 1928, as well as being the primary or secondary armament on many later model Škoda armored vehicles. 45,132 were bought by Czechoslovakia during the interwar. It is believed that the ZB factory turned more than 120,000 ZB-26 guns between 1926 and 1939 in a variety of calibers (the most popular being its original 7.92×57mm Mauser). It was exported to twenty-four European, South American and Asian countries, both in its original form and in the slightly improved ZB-30 version. Large batches of ZB light machine guns went to Bolivia, Bulgaria, China, Romania, Turkey and Yugoslavia. Lithuania and Yugoslavia were the first users to adopt the gun, before the Czechoslovak Army. Exports continued until 1939, when Nazi Germany under Adolf Hitler took over Czechoslovakia. More were produced for export than for the Czechoslovak Army 7,136 ZB-26 were produced in Czechoslovakia after the war, from 1945 to 1953.

The Wehrmacht soon adopted the ZB-26 after the occupation of Czechoslovakia, renaming it the MG 26(t); it was used in the same role as the MG 34, as a light machine gun. In the opening phases of World War II, the ZB-26 in 7.92mm Mauser caliber was used in large numbers by elements of the German Waffen-SS, who at first did not have full access to standard Wehrmacht supply channels. In its most famous incarnation, the ZB-26 was modified by ZB and British technicians, entering service as the famous Bren gun. Many more countries imported or produced the design under license, including China and Yugoslavia. Chinese Nationalist forces used the ZB-26 chambered for the 7.92×57mm Mauser round in their struggle with Communist Chinese and later Imperial Japanese forces. Likewise, the Chinese Red Army (as with any other captured weapon) turned the Nationalists' ZB-26 machine guns against them and the Japanese. According to Brno, from 1927 to 1939, a total of 30,249 ZB-26 were exported to China. Various Chinese pro-Japanese forces, such as the Collaborationist Chinese Army or the Inner Mongolian Army, used it. During this time due to high demand, Chinese small-arms factories—state-owned as well as those controlled by various warlords—were producing the ZB-26 as the Type 26. During the Korean War, Chinese Communist forces employed the ZB-26/Type 26 against UN forces, and PVA ZB gunners developed a well-deserved reputation for long-range marksmanship. During the First Indochina War with French and later South Vietnamese forces, the ZB-26/Type 26 was found in the hands of both North Vietnamese Army and Viet Minh guerrillas.

Variants

 ZB vz. 24: the weapon's predecessor.
 ZB vz. 27: later variant, proposed to Portugal and United Kingdom.
 ZB vz. 30 and ZB 30J: later variants.
 ZGB 30: final modifications to the vz. 30 for British trials.
 ZGB 33: in its final form was virtually identical to the British Bren light machine gun.
 ZB 39: commercial variant similar to the Bren, chambered in various different rounds and having different sights, among other minor changes.
 ZB vz. 52 : post-war derivative of the ZB vz. 26.
 The Japanese Type 97 heavy tank machine gun was a license built copy of the ZB-26 and intended for use in Japanese tanks. It was not normally issued as an infantry light machine gun. Other than the cocking handle being moved from the right side of the receiver to the left it is essentially a duplicate of the Czech gun in operation.
 The Spanish Fusil ametrallador Oviedo was a post-war clone of the ZB vz.26/30.
More designations appear depending on the adopting army, though generally the gun retains its 'ZB 26' initials in one form or another.

Users

 
 
 : 1,080 in 7mm Mauser received in 1930 for the Polícia Militar de Minas Gerais (Military Police of the state of Minas Gerais). Adopted by the São Paulo Public Force
 : 100 of an order of 3,000 ZB-39s delivered, chambered in 8×56mmR
 
 : 11 in 7mm received in 1928
 
 : 30,249 received between 1927 and 1939. Produced under license. Clones made in Taku Naval Dockyard in 1927, later produced in Gongxian Arsenal, the 21st/51st Arsenals.
 
 : Adopted by the Czechoslovak Army as the ZB LK VZ 26.
 : 200 supplied in 1930-1932
 : 1,060 7.7mm ZGB-33 bought in 1937-1939
 : Used against the Italians
 
 : Free Aceh Movement
 : 850 7.7mm ZGB-33 received in 1936-1937
  Imperial State of Iran: ZB vz. 30 produced under license 6,000 ZB-26 received in 1934
 : Used captured Chinese guns 2,200 others were received in 1938-1939
 
 : 600 7.7mm ZGB-33 ordered in 1940
  3,138 VZ 26 machine guns between 1928 and 1937 (7,92 mm kulkosvaidis Brno 26 m.)
  
  Namibia: used by the People's Liberation Army of Namibia.
 : Captured from Bolivian Army during Chaco War, some still in use for training.
 
 : ZB vz. 30 produced under license
  Siam: bought some in the early 1930s
  Slovak Republic
 
 : Used as the Kulsprutegevär m/39
 
 : 85 – 7.7mm ZB-33 bought from 1935 to 1938
 
 : 1,500 delivered
: After the annexation of Czechoslovakia, Hungary received a lot of Czech weaponry and uniforms, including the ZB vz 26.

See also
 Weapons of Czechoslovakia interwar period
Bren Gun - British .303 design
 FM-24/29 light machine gun
 Lahti-Saloranta M/26
 Madsen machine gun
 Mendoza RM2
 Type 96 light machine gun - influenced by ZB vz. 26 design
 Type 97 heavy tank machine gun - license-built loading 7.7x58mm Arisaka ammunition
 Type 99 light machine gun - follow on to the Type 96

References

External links 

 The LK vz. 26 (ZB-26) photogallery
 Modern Firearms
 The Pacific War 5: Chinese Infantry Weapons

8 mm machine guns
7.92×57mm Mauser machine guns
Light machine guns
Machine guns of Czechoslovakia
Machine guns of Manchukuo
World War II infantry weapons of China
World War II infantry weapons of Germany
World War II machine guns
Military equipment introduced in the 1920s